The Florida Complex League Braves are the Rookie-level affiliate of the Atlanta Braves, competing in the Florida Complex League of Minor League Baseball. Prior to 2021, the team was known as the Gulf Coast League Braves. The team plays at CoolToday Park in North Port, Florida. The team is composed mainly of players who are in their first year of professional baseball either as draftees or non-drafted free agents from the United States, Canada, Dominican Republic, Venezuela, and other countries.

History
The team traces its history to the earliest days of complex-based baseball, in reference to major-league teams' spring training complexes. Initially based in Sarasota, Florida, the team was a member of the short-lived Sarasota Rookie League (1964) and Florida Rookie League (1965), and was a charter club in the Gulf Coast League when it was formed in 1966. The team operated from 1964 to 1967, and has operated continuously since 1976.

In 2003, the Braves won a best-of-three series over the GCL Pirates to become league champions. Prior to the 2021 season, the Gulf Coast League was renamed as the Florida Complex League.

Roster

Season-by-season

References

External links
 Official website

Baseball teams established in 1964
Florida Complex League teams
Professional baseball teams in Florida
Gulf
1964 establishments in Florida